is a Japanese former professional footballer who last played for Tokyo Verdy.

Club career
Kondo was born in Utsunomiya on 3 October 1983. He joined J1 League club Kashiwa Reysol from youth team in 2002. He got an opportunity to play in 2003 and became a regular center back in 2004. However he could not play many matches for repeated injuries from 2005. He became a regular player again in summer 2009. However Reysol was relegated J2 League end of 2009 season. In 2010, he played all 34 matches except 2 matches for suspension. Reysol also won the champions in J2 League and was returned to J1 in a year. In 2011, Reysol won the champions in J1 League. He was also selected Best Eleven award. From 2012, Reysol won the champions in 2012 Emperor's Cup and 2013 J.League Cup. However his opportunity to play decreased from 2014. In 2016, he moved to Chiba Prefecture's cross town rivals, JEF United Chiba in J2 League. He played as regular center back in 3 seasons. In 2019, he moved to J2 club Tokyo Verdy.

Kondo retired from professional football in December 2020.

National team career
Kondo was a member of Japan U-20 national football team for 2003 World Youth Championship held in United Arab Emirates.

On February 24, 2012, Kondo debuted for Japan national team against Iceland.

Club statistics

1Includes Japanese Super Cup.

National team statistics

Honours

Club
Kashiwa Reysol
J1 League (1) : 2011
J2 League (1) : 2010
Emperor's Cup (1) : 2012
Japanese Super Cup (1) : 2012
J.League Cup (1) : 2013

Individual
J.League Best XI (1) : 2011

References

External links

 
 Japan National Football Team Database
 
 
 Profile at JEF United Chiba

1983 births
Living people
Association football people from Tochigi Prefecture
Japanese footballers
Japan youth international footballers
Japan international footballers
J1 League players
J2 League players
Kashiwa Reysol players
JEF United Chiba players
Tokyo Verdy players
Association football defenders